Solidarity Szczecin–Goleniów Airport (Polish: Port Lotniczy Szczecin–Goleniów im. About 1.6 million residents live within its catchment area.

History

Early years
It was constructed as a standard military airport with a  runway and basic airport infrastructure (hangars, air traffic control tower, etc.). In 1967, the civilian airport at Dąbie was relocated to the site and named Port Lotniczy Szczecin–Goleniów.

Development since the 1990s

Works to improve the runway and the main apron were undertaken in 1998. The airport's electricity supply together with the runway and approach lighting was upgraded in 1999. A new passenger terminal was opened in 2001 and further expansion works commenced on the terminal in 2005. Construction commenced on a new air traffic control tower in 2004, and was finished by the end of 2005. The terminal expansion concluded in April 2006, at which time the airport was renamed for the Solidarność trade union.

In July 2013, a 4 km spur linking the airport to the mainline between Szczecin and Kołobrzeg opened, creating a direct rail link between the airport and the city of Szczecin. There are three trains a day (two trains on Saturdays) covering the route between Szczecin and the airport using the new 4 km spur.

Airlines and destinations
The following airlines operate regular scheduled and charter flights to and from Szczecin–Goleniów Airport:

Passenger statistics

Ground transportation

Train 
The airport has infrequent train connections to Szczecin (e.g. Szczecin Główny railway station and Szczecin Dąbie railway station), Goleniów, Gryfice and Kołobrzeg. The train takes 45 minutes from Szczecin and 90 minutes from Kołobrzeg to get to the airport.

Road 
The airport is located 45 km away from Szczecin by taxi (45 min), using the S3 and A6 . There are cheap coaches available heading to the city after every planes' arrival.

See also
 List of airports in Poland
 Air ambulances in Poland

References

External links

Official website

Airports in Poland
Transport in Szczecin
Buildings and structures in Szczecin